Scott McIntyre may refer to:

 Scott McIntyre (politician) (born 1933), American politician in the state of Iowa
 Scott McIntyre (journalist), Australian football commentator

See also
 Scott MacIntyre (born 1985), American singer, songwriter, and pianist